The Luchtvaartdienst Suriname is the Civil Aviation Department of the Suriname Ministry of Transport, Communication and Tourism. It is responsible for the regulation of all aviation activities in the country, and ensures that all activities are carried out in compliance with international standards. It is a member of the International Civil Aviation Organization (ICAO).

In April 2010, John Veira, the head of Luchtvaartdienst Suriname, was killed in his home by gunmen.

Airports and Airstrips
Luchtvaartdienst Suriname operates the following domestic airports and airstrips:

References

Government of Suriname
International Civil Aviation Organization